Matlacha (  "MAT-la-shay") is a census-designated place (CDP) in Lee County, Florida, United States. As of the 2020 census, the CDP had a population of 598. It is part of the Cape Coral-Fort Myers, Florida Metropolitan Statistical Area.

Matlacha is an "Old Florida" fishing village, home to many brightly colored art galleries, island boutiques, seafood restaurants, and traditional Floridian cottages. The village was largely devastated by Hurricane Ian in October 2022

Geography
Matlacha is located in northwestern Lee County at  (26.630339, -82.073412), on West Island and Porpoise Point Island at a narrow point in Matlacha Pass, a tidal waterway separating Pine Island and Little Pine Island from the mainland. County Road 78 (Southwest Pine Island Road) crosses the waterway at Matlacha, leading southwest  to Pine Island Center and northeast through Cape Coral  to North Fort Myers. Matlacha is bordered to the northeast, across Matlacha Pass, by the Matlacha Isles-Matlacha Shores CDP.

Demographics

As of the census of 2000, there were 735 people, 409 households, and 213 families residing in the CDP. The racial makeup of the CDP was 98.23% White, 0.27% Native American, 0.27% Asian, 0.68% from other races, and 0.54% from two or more races. Hispanic or Latino of any race were 1.36% of the population. As of the 2010 census, Matlacha's population decreased to 677 and the town's African-American population increased from 0 in 2000 to 2 in 2010.

There were 409 households, out of which 6.4% had children under the age of 18 living with them, 46.9% were married couples living together, 3.9% had a female householder with no husband present, and 47.7% were non-families. 39.4% of all households were made up of individuals, and 19.3% had someone living alone who was 65 years of age or older.  The average household size was 1.80 and the average family size was 2.33.

In the CDP, the population was spread out, with 7.3% under the age of 18, 2.4% from 18 to 24, 17.4% from 25 to 44, 34.7% from 45 to 64, and 38.1% who were 65 years of age or older.  The median age was 58 years. For every 100 females, there were 105.9 males.  For every 100 females age 18 and over, there were 106.4 males.

The median income for a household in the CDP was $36,417, and the median income for a family was $50,000. Males had a median income of $28,056 versus $28,750 for females. The per capita income for the CDP was $24,371.  About 7.4% of families and 9.2% of the population were below the poverty line, including 23.9% of those under age 18 and 2.8% of those age 65 or over.

References

External links
Pine Island Chamber of Commerce

Census-designated places in Lee County, Florida
Census-designated places in Florida
Populated places on Charlotte Harbor
Pine Island (Lee County, Florida)